Lepidium draba, the whitetop or hoary cress, or Thanet cress, is a rhizomatous perennial flowering plant in the family Brassicaceae. It is native to western Asia and southeastern Europe and widely introduced elsewhere.

Description

Whitetop is a perennial herb that reproduces by seeds and by horizontal creeping roots.  The stem is stoutish, erect or spreading, 10 to 80 cm tall, branched, covered sparsely with ash-colored soft hairs to heavily covered.  The leaves are alternating, simple, and mostly toothed.  The basal leaves are 4 to 10 cm, have a slight stem (petiole), and are long and flat, lance-shaped to egg-shaped, with the narrow end attached to the stalk. On the upper part of the stem the leaves are attached directly to the stalk (sessile), are 2 to 6.5 cm long, and are oblong or tapering the point, with broad bases that clasp the stalk.  Whitetop has slightly domed flower clusters in which the individual flower stalks grow upward from various points off the branch to approximately the same height (corymb-like).  The petals are white, clawed, and 3 to 5 mm long, about twice the length of the sepals.

Distribution
It is native to western Asia and southeastern Europe and is an invasive species in North America, introduced by contaminated seeds in the early 1900s. Also known as Cardaria draba, hoary cress is a weed in much of south-east and south-west Australia as well.

Distribution in United States

References

External links
Species Profile - Whitetop (Lepidium draba), National Invasive Species Information Center, United States National Agricultural Library. Lists general information and resources for Whitetop.
Hoary cress - Lepidium draba, Invasive Plant Atlas of the United States,
Cardaria_spp, Bugwood Wiki - Invasive Pest Management

Other reading
Agriculture Research Service (1970) "Cardaria draba (L.) Deav." Selected Weeds of the United States Agriculture Research Service United States Department of Agriculture, Washington, DC, p. 200

draba
Plants described in 1753
Taxa named by Carl Linnaeus